Dicheranthus is a monotypic genus of flowering plants belonging to the family Caryophyllaceae. The only species is Dicheranthus plocamoides.

Its native range is Canary Islands.

References

Caryophyllaceae
Monotypic Caryophyllaceae genera